Senior General Counsel is the chief public prosecutor at the federal level in Canada. The SGC leads an office of General Counsel known as the Federal Prosecution Service of Canada.

References

 Senior General Counsel

Law of Canada
Prosecution
Legal professions